Mohamed Sofiane Bouchar (born 21 May 1994) is an Algerian footballer who plays for CR Belouizdad in the Algerian Ligue Professionnelle 1. In February 2014, he made his senior debut as a starter in a league match against MC Oran.

Honours
ES Sétif
 Algerian Ligue Professionnelle 1: 2014–15, 2016–17
 Algerian Super Cup: 2015

CR Belouizdad
 Algerian Ligue Professionnelle 1: 2020–21

References

External links
 
 

1994 births
Algeria under-23 international footballers
Algerian footballers
Algerian Ligue Professionnelle 1 players
CR Belouizdad players
ES Sétif players
MC Oran players
Living people
Sportspeople from Skikda
Association football central defenders
21st-century Algerian people